No Fun Aloud is the debut solo studio album by Glenn Frey. It was released in 1982 on Asylum.

The album reached #32 on the charts and contained two top 40 singles, "The One You Love" and "I Found Somebody". The album was certified Gold by the RIAA, selling over 500,000 (half a million) copies in the United States.

Critical reception
AllMusic critic Mike DeGagne wrote that "it's Frey's perfectly guided vocals and impeccable talent for crafting laid-back love songs that make[s] the album noteworthy ... With Frey's own production assistance, No Fun Aloud stands up as a modest debut album." The Rolling Stone Album Guide called No Fun Aloud "a predictably slick solo debut in [Frey's] old band's party-boy mode." The Globe and Mail called it "remarkably uninspired and joyless," writing that "by and large, the songs are of the John David Souther school of no-melody dirge—the type of thing that gives California music a bad name." The New York Times deemed it "an agreeable, well-crafted little record."

Track listing
All songs by Glenn Frey and Jack Tempchin, except where noted.

Personnel 

 Glenn Frey – lead vocals, organ (1), lead guitar (1, 3, 4, 8), electric piano (2, 5, 7, 8), guitar (2, 5, 10), bass (2, 9), drum machine programming (2, 9), acoustic piano (3), backing vocals (4, 10), all other instruments (9), clavinet (10), synthesizers (10)
 David "Hawk" Wolinski – synthesizers (1, 10), organ (4, 6, 7, 8)
 Clayton Ivey – acoustic piano (6)
 Allan Blazek – additional keyboards (10)
 Josh Leo – guitar (1, 3)
 Danny Kortchmar – guitar (4)
 Duncan Cameron – electric guitar (6, 7, 8)
 Wayne Perkins – acoustic guitar (7)
 Bryan Garofalo – bass (1)
 Bob Glaub – bass (3, 5, 10)
 Roberto Piñón – bass (4)
 David Hood – bass (6, 7, 8)
 Michael Huey – drums (1, 3, 4, 10)
 John Robinson – drums (5)
 Roger Hawkins – drums (6, 7, 8), bells (7, 8)
 Steve Forman – percussion (5, 9)
 Al Garth – tenor saxophone (1)
 Jim Horn – tenor saxophone (2)
 Ernie Watts – saxophone (2)
 The Heart Attack Horns (5):
 Greg Smith – baritone saxophone
 Bill Bergman – tenor saxophone
 Jim Coile – alto saxophone
 John Berry, Jr. – trumpet
 Lee Thornburg – trumpet, horn arrangements
 Ronnie Eades – saxophone (6)
 Harvey Thompson – saxophone (6)
 Jim Ed Norman – string arrangements (2, 7), horn arrangements (5)
 The Monstertones – backing vocals (3)
 Marcy Levy – backing vocals (4)
 Bill Champlin – backing vocals (4)
 Tom Kelly – backing vocals (4)
 Julia Waters – backing vocals (8, 10)
 Maxine Waters – backing vocals (8, 10)
 Oren Waters – backing vocals (8, 10)

Production
 Producers – Glenn Frey, Allan Blazek and Jim Ed Norman.
 Recorded by The Wlider Brothers
 Engineers – Allan Blazek and Steve Melton
 Assistant Engineers – Ray Blair, Glenn Frey, George Gomez, Ben King, Mary Beth McLemore and Jay Parti.
 Mixed by Allan Blazek at Bayshore Recording Studios (Coconut Grove, FL).
 Art Direction and Design – Jeff Adamoff
 Photography – Jim Shea
 Direction – Irving Azoff

Charts
Album – Billboard (United States)

Singles – Billboard (United States)

References 

Glenn Frey albums
1982 debut albums
Elektra Records albums
Asylum Records albums
Albums produced by Jim Ed Norman
Albums recorded at Muscle Shoals Sound Studio